Kretschmer is a German surname.  occupational surname literally meaning "innkeeper" associated with the term  for village inn.  It comes from Middle High German kretschmar, which was borrowed from a Slavic language, e.g. Czech krčmář. Other forms include Krechmer, Kretchmer, Kretschmar, Kretzschmar, and Kreczmar (Polonized form).

Notable people with the surname include:

 Ernst Kretschmer (1888–1964), German psychiatrist
 Gero Kretschmer (born 1985), German tennis player
 Otto Kretschmer (1912–1998), German U-Boat commander in World War II
 Paul Kretschmer (1866–1956), German linguist
 Michael Kretschmer (born 1975), German politician
 Daniel Kretschmer, German hip hop and reggae musician
 Tim Kretschmer (1991–2009), German spree killer

Krechmer
Michael Krechmer, original name of Michael Malice, Ukrainian-American author, and podcaster

References

See also
 

German-language surnames
Surnames of Slavic origin
Occupational surnames